The 12th Foreign Infantry Regiment was an infantry regiment of the Foreign Legion in the  French Army which existed from 1939 to 1940 at the beginning of World War II.

History
The regiment was sent from its training camp at La Valbonne straight into action at Soissons, Picardy on 11 May 1940. After fighting its way out of encirclement it was broken as a unit by 6 June 1940. By the Armistice the remaining men, only 300 of the 2,800 men that had completed training, had reached Limoges in central France.

See also

Major (France)
Music of the Foreign Legion (MLE)
11th Foreign Infantry Regiment

Notes

References

Defunct French Foreign Legion units
Military units and formations established in 1939
Military units and formations disestablished in 1940